All in the Mind is a half-hour magazine radio programme about psychology and psychiatry, broadcast in weekly episodes on Radio 4 and produced by the BBC's Science Unit. It is currently presented by Claudia Hammond. Former presenters have included Raj Persaud, Kwame McKenzie, Tanya Byron, and the first presenter of the series, Anthony Clare.

Scheduling
The programme is typically broadcast at 9 pm on a Tuesday, with a repeat the next day (Wednesday) at 3:30 pm.

Partial episode list for 2011 series

Episode list for 2012 series
Episode descriptions are largely as provided by the BBC.

References

Further reading

External links 
 

BBC Radio 4 programmes
Psychiatry in the United Kingdom
Works about psychiatry